The Tirukkural, shortly known as the Kural, is a classic Tamil sangam treatise on the art of living. Consisting of 133 chapters with 1330 couplets or kurals, it deals with the everyday virtues of an individual. Authored by Valluvar between the first century BCE and 5th century CE, it is considered one of the greatest works ever written on ethics and morality and is praised for its universality and non-denominational nature.

The universality of the work is expressed by the various other names by which the text is given by, such as Tamiḻ maṟai (Tamil veda), Poyyāmoḻi (words that never fail), Vāyurai vāḻttu (truthful utterances), Ulaga pothumaṟai (The universal veda), and Deiva nūl (divine text). The Kural has been praised for its veracity over the millennia by intellects around the globe. This article lists the quotations on the Kural text by various individuals over the centuries.

A

"அணுவைத் துளைத்தேழ் கடலைப் புகட்டிக் குறுகத் தறித்த குறள்" ["Thiruvalluvar pierced an atom and injected seven seas into it and compressed it into what we have today as Kural."](Avvaiyar, ancient Tamil poet, c. 1st and 2nd century CE)
"The book without a name by an author without a name.""The masterpiece of Tamil literature, one of the highest and purest expressions of human thought. That which above all is wonderful in the Kural is a fact that its author addresses himself without regard to castes, peoples or beliefs to the whole community of mankind; the fact that he formulates sovereign morality and absolute reason; that he proclaims in their very essence, in their eternal abstractness, virtue and truth; that he presents, as it were in one group, the highest laws of domestic and social life; that he is equally perfect in thought, in language and in poetry in the austere metaphysial contemplation of the great mysteries of the Divine Nature as in the easy and graceful analysis of the tenderest emotions of the heart."(Monsieur Ariel, translator and publisher of the third part of the Kural to French, 1848)
"Thirukkural is gnomic poetry, the greatest in planned conception and force of execution ever written in this kind."(Sri Aurobindo, Indian nationalist, philosopher, yogi, and poet, 1872–1950)

B

"வள்ளுவன் தன்னை இவ்வுலகினுக்கேத் தந்து வான்புகழ் கொண்ட தமிழ்நாடு" ["Tamil Nadu had given Valluvar unto the World and had thereby won great renown."](Subramania Bharathi, Poet and Indian nationalist, 1882–1921)
"The oldest surviving vernacular literature is in the Dravidian language, Tamil, which includes works possible as old as the first century of the Christian Era. The best known classical Tamil work is the Kural ('Aphoristic Stanzas') by the weaver Thiruvalluvar, who lived sometime between the first and fifth centuries of the Christian Era."(W. Norman Brown, American Indologist and Sanskritist, 1892–1975)

C

"It is difficult to judge from the tenor of his Cural to what sect he belonged: for he has entirely avoided in the work everything that savours of sectarianism, in order to harmonize the suffrages of all the sects."(Simon Casie Chetty, Ceylonese author, 1807–1860)

D
"The Cural has a strong claim upon our attention, as a part of the literature of the country, and as a work of intrinsic excellence. The author, passing over what is peculiar to particular classes of society, and introducing such ideas only as are common to all, has avoided the uninteresting details of observances found in Menu and the other shastras; and thus in general maintains a dignified style; though it must be acknowledged that he sometimes descends to puerilities."(William Henry Drew, 19th-century Christian missionary)

G

"A textbook of indispensable authority on moral life.""The maxims of Valluvar have touched my soul. There is none who has given such a treasure of wisdom like him.""We may not all be aware even of the name of Sage Thiruvalluvar. North Indian people certainly do not know his name. Few saints have given to the people as much knowledge as he has done in the minimum of words."(Mahatma Gandhi, Indian nationalist, 1869–1948)Note: Mahatma Gandhi took to studying Tirukkural in prison after he learnt about the work from Leo Tolstoy through the latter's letter A Letter to a Hindu.
"There are a great number of problems, economic, political and social, standing in the way of a ruler. Solutions and guidance for such problems can be found in Kuralism, the maxims of Tirukural."(Indira Gandhi, Former Prime Minister of India, 1917–1984)
"Humility, charity and forgiveness of injuries, being Christian qualities, are not described by Aristotle. Now these three are everywhere forcibly inculcated by the Tamil Moralist."(Sir A. Grant)
"The Kural's sentences are as binding as the Ten Commandments on the Jews. Kural is as important and influential on the Tamil mind as Dante's great work on the language and thought of Italy."(Charles E. Gover, English folklorist, d. 1872)
"No translation can convey any idea of its charming effect. It is truly an apple of gold in a network of silver."(Dr. Karl Graul, German Lutheran missionary, and German and Latin translator of the Kural, 1814–1864)

H

 "Everyone knows the Tirukkural, one of the world’s greatest works on ethics; but this is merely one of a myriad of major and extremely varied works that comprise the Tamil classical tradition. There is not a facet of human existence that is not explored and illuminated by this great literature."(George L. Hart, American Indologist, 1945–)
 Tirukkural "is a poetic work on morals, of great merit as a literary performance.... The author commences his book with an acknowledgment of God, in a style which, in the production of a heathen, we cannot but greatly admire; and throughout the whole he evinces a singular degree of freedom from many of the strong prejudices of the Hindus, although he frequently illustrates his positions by allusions to the mythology and doctrines of the superstition of his country."(Rev. Elijah Hoole, English orientalist and Wesleyan Methodist missionary, 1798–1872)
 "Thirukkural is a treasure house of worldly knowledge, ethical guidance and spiritual wisdom. In the majority of its 1330 couplets even where the theme was commonplace the treatment was artistic and the play of sentiment, image and sound had a perennial interest.""Thiruvalluvar was one of the greatest products of Indian Culture. The saint's idealism, his philosophy, humane practical sense and universal ethical code had mingled into the mainstream of Indian Culture and had become part of the common cultural heritage and philosophers of India."(Zakir Hussain, former president of India, 1897–1969)

I
"What mattered (Thiruvalluvar) was not metaphysics, dogma, creedal adhesions or regular ritualistic practices but rather the reality of everyday life with its constant need for nuances of understanding and behaviour. Thirukkural, thus, became the crystallization of ripe wisdom and sage counsel and utilising good sense."(K. R. Srinivasa Iyengar, Indian writer, 1908–1999)
"But whether he [Valluvar] borrows, his material from Sanskrit or follows Tamil tradition, he displays an originality of treatment and a sequence of ideas entirely his own, which contributes much to the merit of the poem.""Artists have always refused to admit didactic poetry into the legitimate realms of the Muse, but if excellence of workmanship and the occasional illumination of moral teaching by flashes of true poetic fire can justify the acceptance of any didactic poem as true poetry and the Thirukkural is that poem."(P. T. Srinivasa Iyengar, Indian historian, linguist and educationist, 1863–1931)

K

"Thirukkural is considered to provide the code of conduct for the humanity of the planet earth for all time, which makes the past meet the present and creates the future."(A. P. J. Abdul Kalam, former president of India, 1931–2015)

L
"No Tamil work can ever approach the purity of the Kural. It is a standing repute to modern Tamil."(Rev. John Lazarus, Christian missionary, 1845–1925)

M

"If Thirukkural is taught with all its avenues and dimensions elaborately, students would be equipped with all the facets of life, the probable problems and the solutions. The couplets about friendship, hard work, good character, patience, tolerance and confidence will guide them through, even the most difficult of times. Thirukkural will give them the inner strength to withstand any storm."“No other philosophical or religious work has such moral and intellectual approach to problems of life.”“The future of every country lies at the hands of younger generation. It is the duty of the state to show them the rightful path and there is no other better philosophy than what is preached in Thirukkural.”(Madras High Court, 2016)
 "The Kural is the core of the spirit of the Tamil people. And the most remarkable point is that it is threaded through with 'Love to the others.'"(Shuzo Matsunaga, First Japanese translator of the Tirukkural, 1921–)
"I bow to the great Thiruvalluvar. Simple and vast in scope, his thoughts & writings have been a strong influence on humanity for centuries. . . . Thirukkural does not refer to any nation, leader, society, language, religion or caste in the entire book, which is why it has been called the 'Universal Veda.'"(Narendra Modi, Indian Prime Minister, 1950–)
"Thirukkural is a treatise par excellence on the art of living."(K. M. Munshi, Indian independence movement activist, politician, writer and educationist, 1887–1971)

"Thiruvalluvar, the author of the Kural, occupies first place as a moralist among the Tamils. Indeed it is generally acknowledged that there is no treatise equal to the Kural in any Indian language.""The contents of the work represent the general aphoristic wisdom of India and do not belong to any particular section."(John Murdoch, Christian missionary in Ceylon and India, 1819–1904)

N
"Touching its spiritual greatness I must say Thirukkural begins where Bhagawat Gita exited.""Tirukkural is not a matter for discussion or discourses as it remains to dismiss discussion and discourses.""When I started making a deep and detailed study of Tirukkural I was really startled t herald a new World in it—a world that I have never had seen. As unable to bear or withstand its powerful light that struck against me I closed the book as one closes his eyes against the powerful Sun. I pondered over this, days and nights, with mixed feelings. Opening the book again I, from a distance,, examined a few further lines. Spiritualism involved in the extremity of science is found anywhere in the book as the sun found reflected anywhere in the ocean or a clear body of water."(Tiruvallam Bhaskaran Nair, Malayalam poet and Malayalam translator of the Kural text)

"The Kural is certainly among the greatest of non-Christian classics."(Bishop Stephen Neill, Christian missionary)

P

"[Tirukkural] will be read with pleasure, as affording proof of the existence of the loftiest sentiments, the purest moral rules, and equal power of conception and expression. Nothing certainly, in the whole compass of human language, can equal the force and terseness of the sententious distichs in which the author conveys the lessons of wisdom he utters."(Rev. Peter Percival, Christian missionary and the reviser of the Tamil version of the Bible)
"Perfection of human nature is the be-all and end-all of Kural. Before I resume my seat let me make one humble bow to the Prince of Moralists."(J. M. Nallaswami Pillai, Tamil scholar, 1864–1920)

"Thiruvalluvar, the author of Kural, addresses neither the King, subject, nor priest, but man. He does not address man either as the law-giver or prophet but as well-wisher, teacher and friend. He neither prophesied nor spoke in hints and riddles; his words contained no shade of doubts, he had full conviction of the truth of what he said, both as an artist and thinker.""Thiruvalluvar is rightly considered as Chef d'oeuvre of both Indian and world literature. This is due not only to the great artistic merits of the work but also to the lofty humane ideas permeating it which are equally precious to the people all over the world, of all periods and countries."(Alexander Piatigorsky, Russian philosopher, 1929–2009)

"The Kural owes much of its popularity to its exquisite poetic form. The brevity rendered necessary by the form gives an oracular effect to the utterances of the great Tamil 'Master of Sentences'. They are the choicest of moral epigrams. Their resemblance to gnomic poetry of Greece is remarkable as to their subjects, their sentiments and the state of society when they are uttered. Something of the same kind is found in Greek epigrams, in Martial and the Latin elegiac verse. There is a beauty in the periodic character of the Tamil construction in many of these verses that read minds, the reader of the happiest efforts of properties.""He was undoubtedly one of the great geniuses of the world. Complete in itself, the sole work of its author (the Kural) has come down the stream of ages, absolutely uninjured, hardly a single various readings of any importance being found. In value it (Kural) outweighs the whole of the remaining Tamil Literature and is one of the selected numbers of great works which have entered into the very soul of a whole people and which can never die."(George Uglow Pope, Christian missionary to India, 1820–1908)

R
"It is the gospel of love and a code of soul-luminous life. The whole of human aspiration is epitomized in this immortal book, a book for all ages.""Among the precious classics of the world literature the Kural takes a place in the front rank.""Thiruvalluvar was one of those rare and great men whose catholic spirit rose above all denominations and whose vision was not clouded by dogma or prejudice of any kind. His teachings elude classification on any denominational basis."(Rajaji, Governor-General of India, 1878–1972)
"Tirukkural contains all things and there is nothing which it does not contain."(E. J. Robinson, Protestant missionary to British India)

S
"Great thinkers belong to the world. Thiruvalluvar belongs not only to Tamilnadu but also to the whole of India, nay, to the whole world. He wrote for the benefit of the whole mankind.""After reading Kural, we will realise that Indian culture all over the country is one. The art of this great country is full of the same blood."(Sane Guruji, Marathi author, teacher, and nationalist, 1899–1950)

"There hardly exists in the literature of the world a collection of maxims in which we find so much of lofty wisdom.""World and life negation are found in the thought of Jesus insofar as he did not assume that the Kingdom of God would be realized in this natural world. He expected that this natural world would very speedily come to an end and be superseded by a supernatural world in which all that is imperfect and evil would be overcome by the 'power of God'. On the contrary, Valluvar believed that in this very natural world, the liberated man can find his heaven and said that perfect bliss could be attained by an individual in this natural world itself and it is unnecessary to wait indefinitely for the transformation of the world in order to transform oneself. Thus, he took life and world affirmation to a loftier plane than Christ did.""The idea of active love did arise in the popular ethics of India in fairly ancient times. We know from many stories we meet in her literature and especially through the ethical maxims found in the Kural, a work which probably belongs to the second century A.D.""In the ethics of the Kural, as in those of the Laws of Manu, the idea of reward has a place. The way of virtue is recommended because it leads to a better reincarnation or to liberation from re-birth.""Whilst Bhagavad Gita in a forced and chilly manner gives as a motive for remaining in active life that it is in accordance with the order of universe, the Kural justifies it – what an advance – by the idea of ethical activity. Work and profit place a man in a position to do good. According to the Kural, duty is not contained as in the Bhagavad Gita to what the caste calling involves but consists in general in 'all that is good'.""Maxims about joy in activity, such as one would not expect from the Indian lips, bear witness to the strength of the world and life affirmation present in the Kural.""Like the Buddha and the Bhagavad Gita, the Kural desires inner freedom from the world and a mind free from hatred. Like them it stands for the commandment not to kill and not to damage. It has appropriated all the valuable ethical results of the thought of world and life negation. But in addition to this ethic of inwardness, there appears in the Kural the living ethic of love.""With sure stroke, the Kural draws the ideal of simple ethical humanity. On the most varied questions concerning the conduct of man to the world its utterances are characterized by nobility and good sense."(Albert Schweitzer, French-German theologian, organist, philosopher, and physician, 1875–1965)
"Thirukkural is essentially a book on ethical philosophy. It portrays a way of life and it lays down a code of conduct. The author's beliefs are simply stated; he believes in God. The first ten verses are in praise of God. But he does not call God by name so that he can be identified with one religion or another. He refers to him as the Wise One, the Incomparable One, and as the Sage of the sea of virtue. He is completely non-denominational. He also seems to believe in rebirth. Often, he refers to 'seven births' or 'countless births'."(Swami Shivanandha, Indian spiritual leader)
"It is the duty of individuals and groups to study this guide book of ethics and honour the author and his work."(Sardar Ujjal Singh, Former governor of Punjab and Tamil Nadu, 1895–1983)

T

"The ideas of great Saint Thiruvalluvar will apply not only to India but the whole world."(Rabindranath Tagore, Indian poet, 1861–1941)
"The sacred Kural, in all its aspects appears to be a Hindu Kural.""What are wanted for the Indian as for the Englishman, the Frenchman, the German, and the Russian, are not Constitutions and Revolutions, nor all sorts of Conferences and Congresses, nor the many ingenious devices for submarine navigation and aerial navigation, nor powerful explosives, nor all sorts of conveniences to add to the enjoyment of the rich, ruling classes; nor gramophones and cinematographs, not those childish and for the most part corrupt stupidities termed art – but one thing only is needful: the knowledge of the simple and clear truth which finds place in every soul that is not stupefied by religious and scientific superstitions – the truth that for our life one law is valid – the law of love, which brings the highest happiness to every individual as well as to all mankind."(Leo Tolstoy, Russian writer, 1828–1910)Note:Leo Tolstoy was inspired by the concept of non-violence found in the Tirukkural when he read a German version of the book, who in turn instilled the concept in Mahatma Gandhi through his A Letter to a Hindu when young Gandhi sought his advice.
"ஆலும் வேலும் பல்லுக்குறுதி; நாலும் இரண்டும் சொல்லுக்குறுதி." (Banyan and neem maintain oral health; Four [the quatrains of Naladiyar] and Two [the couplets of Tirukkural] maintain moral health.)(Ancient Tamil maxim)

V
"'Thirukkural', the masterpiece of Tamil literature written by Thiruvalluvar, should be announced as a national book. Thiruvalluvar, one of the greatest authors in Indian history, wrote Thirukkural more than 2000 years ago. The Thirukkural is one of the most revered ancient works in the Tamil language. It is considered a 'common creed', providing a guide for human morals and betterment in life. The Thirukkural has been translated into several languages."(Vairamuthu, Indian poet and lyricist, 1953–)

W
"Thirukkural is a synthesis of the best moral teachings of the world."(Rev. Emmons E. White)

Y
"Whenever I read a couplet from Thirukkural here and there, as I do daily, I am surprised at almost every readings at its freshness and relevance to the problems of our times – for such is its Universality and Humanism."(Yu Hsi, Taiwanese poet and translator of Tirukkural in Mandarin)

Z
"Thirukkural is a great work; and its author must have been a great man, and a great genius; ... Man in the totality of his relationship is the subject of the Kural. After a 'cosmic' introduction, which praises God, rain, supermen and virtue, the author of the book turns towards man, whose personality is gradually unfolded in 'ever expanding concentric cycles' within the family with his wife and children, within the community with his friends, and within his country in his relationship towards the ruler and the state. Man is shown not in a static state but in the development, and the force that is behind this dynamism is sympathy, even love, manifesting itself through kind thoughts, sweet words, and right actions.""The Kural, one of the great books of the World, one of those singular emanations of human heart and spirit which preaches positive love, forgiveness and peace.""As regards the Kural it stands on its merits. The purity of its Tamil, the richness of its diction, the lofty tone of its morality, the theistic and unsectarian nature of its theology, the endless variety of topics discussed in its one hundred and thirty-three chapters and the profound esteem in which it is held by all classes of Tamil-speaking Hindus are too well-known to need praise or comment.""One should never contemplate the couplets in isolation. We must again and again stress that they have true validity and meaning only in their patterned relation to other couplets, and to the whole. And when read and contemplated in this way, Thiruvalluvar's ethics is never that of a Chanakya or a Macchiavelli.""Let it be said in conclusion that it is almost impossible to truly appreciate the maxims of the Kural through a translation. Thirukkural must be read and re-read in Tamil. This fact, too, reveals something about the nature and degree of its 'poetic excellence'.""It is more important that he was also a very integral part of the non-Sanskrit and pre-Sanskrit Tamil tradition. This fact is seen not only from his conception of 'pleasure' which is so typically a reflexion of the akam genre, but also from the all-pervading pragmatic, this-worldly, empirical and, to a great extent, humanistic and universalistic character of his particular conception of dharma and justice.""Above all I believe that the outstanding works of Tamil literature of the past, and the very interesting writings of the present times, should be translated, published and spread wide, they intrinsically belongs to the literary heritage of the world and man's culture will be enriched by their general knowledge.""Thiruvalluvar's Kamattuppal is utterly different from any of the Sanskrit Kamasastras. While Vatsyayana's work (and all later Sanskrit erotology) is Sastra, that is, objective and scientific analysis of sex, the third part of the Kural is a poetic picture of eros, of ideal love, of its dramatic situations. As a work of literary art, [it] reveals a single structural plan, and looks like a work of a single master ... In the erotic couplets of the third part (Kamattuppal), the teacher, the preacher in Valluvar has stepped aside and the poet speaks almost the language of the superb love poetry of the classical Age."(Kamil Zvelebil, Czech scholar in Indian literature and linguistics, 1927–2009)

See also
 Tirukkural translations
 List of Tirukkural translations by language

Citations

References

Further reading
M. Rajaram. (2015). Glory of Thirukkural. Chennai, India: International Institute of Tamil Studies. 
V. Tamilarasu. (2014). Kuralamizhdham. Chennai, India: Arutchudar Anbar Group.

External links
 G. U. Pope's English Translation of the Tirukkural

Tirukkural